The List of Ministers of Communications of Russia contains the names of the people who held this position in the Russian Empire, the Russian Soviet Federative Socialist Republic, the Soviet Union and the modern Russian Federation.

Russian Empire

Postal Department of the Ministry of Internal Affairs
The Postal Department of the Ministry of the Interior of the Russian Empire was formed by the Highest registered decree on November 9, 1819.

In 1830, it was transformed into the Postal Department of the Russian Empire.

Postal Department of the Russian Empire
It was formed as a ministry in 1830 with separation from the Ministry of the Interior.

On June 15, 1865, it was transformed into the Ministry of Posts and Telegraphs of the Russian Empire.

Ministry of Posts and Telegraphs
It was established on June 15, 1865, by combining the Postal Department and the Telegraph Unit separated from the Ministry of the Interior (Personal Decree of June 15, 1865).

On March 9, 1868, it was abolished, the Postal and Telegraph Departments were created as part of the Ministry of the Interior.

Postal and Telegraph Departments of the Ministry of Internal Affairs
Formed on March 9, 1868, instead of the Ministry of Posts and Telegraphs. Both departments were headed by Ivan Velio, then Gubaidulla Chingizkhan, who was also the director of the Department of Railways of the Ministry of Internal Affairs of the Russian Empire.

On August 6, 1880, they were transferred to the reconstituted Ministry of Posts and Telegraphs.

Ministry of Posts and Telegraphs
It was re-established on August 6, 1880, from the Department of Posts and Telegraphs of the Ministry of the Interior.

On March 16, 1881, it was again divided into the Postal and Telegraph Departments, which became part of the Ministry of the Interior.

Telegraph Department of the Ministry of Internal Affairs
It was founded on March 16, 1881.

On May 22, 1884, it was merged with the Postal Department of the Ministry of the Interior into the Main Directorate of Posts and Telegraphs of the Ministry of the Interior.

Postal Department of the Ministry of Internal Affairs
It was founded on March 16, 1881.

On May 22, 1884, it was merged with the Telegraph Department of the Ministry of the Interior into the Main Directorate of Posts and Telegraphs of the Ministry of the Interior.

Main Directorate of Posts and Telegraphs of the Ministry of Internal Affairs
It was established on May 22, 1884, at the merger of the Postal and Telegraph Departments of the Ministry of the Interior.

Provisional Government

Ministry of Posts and Telegraphs

Russian Socialist Federative Soviet Republic

People's Commissariat of Posts and Telegraphs

Ministry of Communications
It was founded on January 3, 1955.

It was abolished in 1963 (Decree of the Presidium of the Supreme Council of the Russian Soviet Federative Socialist Republic of April 18, 1963 "On the Abolition of the Union–Republican Ministry of Communications of the Russian Soviet Federative Socialist Republic" and the Law of the Russian Soviet Federative Socialist Republic of December 25, 1963 "On the Approval of Decrees of the Presidium Supreme Council of the Russian Soviet Federative Socialist Republic and on Amendments and Additions to Articles 47, 54 and 55 of the Constitution (Basic Law) of the Russian Soviet Federative Socialist Republic").

It was re-formed in 1979 (Decree of the Presidium of the Supreme Council of the Russian Soviet Federative Socialist Republic of July 13, 1979 "On the Establishment of the Ministry of Communications of the Russian Soviet Federative Socialist Republic" and the Law of the Russian Soviet Federative Socialist Republic of August 3, 1979 "On the Council of Ministers of the Russian Soviet Federative Socialist Republic").

On July 14, 1990, it was transformed into the Ministry of the Russian Soviet Federative Socialist Republic for Communications, Informatics, and Space. However, no amendment was made to the Law of the Russian Soviet Federative Socialist Republic "On the Council of Ministers of the Russian Soviet Federative Socialist Republic".

Ministry of Communications, Informatics and Space
It was established on July 14, 1990, on the basis of the Ministry of Communications of the Russian Soviet Federative Socialist Republic (Law of the Russian Soviet Federative Socialist Republic "On Republican Ministries and Committees of the Russian Soviet Federative Socialist Republic" of July 14, 1990).

On November 10, 1991, the Ministry of Communications of the Russian Soviet Federative Socialist Republic was restored.

Ministry of Communications
Established on November 10, 1991, on the basis of the Ministry of the Russian Soviet Federative Socialist Republic for Communications, Informatics and Space (Decree of the President of the Russian Soviet Federative Socialist Republic of November 10, 1991, No. 181).

On December 25, 1991, the Supreme Council of the Russian Soviet Federative Socialist Republic adopted a law on the renaming of the Russian Soviet Federative Socialist Republic into the Russian Federation. On April 21, 1992, the Congress of People's Deputies of the Russian Soviet Federative Socialist Republic approved the renaming, introducing corresponding amendments to the Constitution of the Russian Soviet Federative Socialist Republic, which entered into force on May 16, 1992.

Soviet Union

People's Commissariat of Posts and Telegraphs

It was founded on July 6, 1923.

On January 17, 1932, it was renamed the People's Commissariat of Communications of the Soviet Union.

People's Commissariat of Communications

It was formed on January 17, 1932, by renaming the People's Commissariat of Posts and Telegraph of the Soviet Union.

On March 15, 1946, it was transformed into a ministry of the same name.

Ministry of Communications

It was founded on March 15, 1946, from the People's Commissariat of the same name.

It was liquidated on December 26, 1991, in connection with the termination of the existence of the Soviet Union.

Russian Federation

Ministry of Communications

On March 17, 1997, it was transformed into the State Committee of the Russian Federation for Communications and Informatization.

State Committee of Communications and Informatization
It was established on March 17, 1997, on the basis of the Ministry of Communications of the Russian Federation (Decree of the President of the Russian Federation of March 17, 1997, No. 249).

On May 25, 1999, it was transformed into the State Committee of the Russian Federation for Telecommunications.

State Committee of Telecommunications
It was formed on May 25, 1999, on the basis of the State Committee of the Russian Federation for Communications and Informatization (Decree of the President of the Russian Federation of May 25, 1999, No. 651).

On November 12, 1999, it was transformed into the Ministry of the Russian Federation for Communications and Informatization.

Ministry of Communications and Informatization
It was established on November 12, 1999, on the basis of the State Committee of the Russian Federation for Telecommunications (Decree of the President of the Russian Federation of November 12, 1999, No. 1487).

On March 9, 2004, it was merged with the Ministry of Transport of the Russian Federation into the Ministry of Transport and Communications of the Russian Federation.

Ministry of Transport and Communications
It was established on March 9, 2004, when the Ministry of the Russian Federation for Communications and Informatization and the Ministry of Transport of the Russian Federation merged (Decree of the President of the Russian Federation of March 9, 2004, No. 314).

On May 20, 2004, it was divided into the Ministry of Transport of the Russian Federation and the Ministry of Information Technologies and Communications of the Russian Federation.

Ministry of Information Technologies and Communications
Established on May 20, 2004, under the division of the Ministry of Transport and Communications of the Russian Federation (Decree of the President of the Russian Federation of May 20, 2004, No. 649).

On May 12, 2008, it was transformed into the Ministry of Communications and Mass Media of the Russian Federation.

Ministry of Communications and Mass Media

It was established on May 12, 2008, on the basis of the Ministry of Information Technologies and Communications of the Russian Federation (Decree of the President of the Russian Federation of May 12, 2008, No. 724).

On May 15, 2018, it was renamed the Ministry of Digital Development, Communications and Mass Media (Decree of the President of the Russian Federation of May 15, 2018, No. 215).

Ministry of Digital Development, Telecommunications and Mass Media
Formed on May 15, 2018, by renaming the Ministry of Communications and Mass Communications of the Russian Federation (Decree of the President of the Russian Federation of May 15, 2018, No. 215).

References

Sources
Abel Yanovsky. Ministry of the Interior // Brockhaus and Efron Encyclopedic Dictionary: in 86 Volumes (82 Volumes and 4 Additional) – Saint Petersburg, 1890–1907
State Power of the Soviet Union. The Supreme Bodies of Power and Administration and Their Leaders, 1923–1991: Historically–Biographical Information / Author, Compiled by Vladimir Ivkin – Moscow: ROSSPEN, 1999 – 637, [2] Pages – 
Mail // Brockhaus and Efron Encyclopedic Dictionary: in 86 Volumes (82 Volumes and 4 Additional) – Saint Petersburg, 1890–1907
Denis Shilov. Statesmen of the Russian Empire. Heads of Higher and Central Institutions. 1802–1917: Bibliographic Information / Denis Shilov; European University in Saint Petersburg – Saint Petersburg: Dmitry Bulanin, 2001 – 830 Pages –

External links

Lists of government ministers of Russia
Communications in Russia
Lists of government ministers of the Soviet Union